Ian Birkby (born 1961) is a technology CEO, Ph.D. and former professional rugby league footballer who played as a  in the 1970s and 1980s. Currently, he is the chief executive officer of AZoNetwork.

He played at club level for Castleford (Heritage № 606), Oldham, York and Doncaster (Heritage No. 554),

Background
Birkby was born in Pontefract district, West Riding of Yorkshire, England, where he became a member of the Knottingley Town junior cricket team in the 1970s. He has first class honours B.Sc. degree in Engineering Metallurgy from the University of Salford, and a Ph.D. in Engineering Ceramics and Tribology from the University of Leeds. He emigrated to New South Wales, Australia.

Sporting career
Birkby played a range of sports to a high level in his childhood including football, county-level cricket and rugby union.

Whilst studying at university, Birkby played as a professional rugby player representing Castleford at scrum half from 1980-1983 before moving to Oldham RLFC with a brief stint at York RLFC before finishing his career at Doncaster.

He returned to playing rugby union in his thirties. However, he was prevented from playing for amateur team Wilmslow RUFC in the 1990s. This was due to a rule between the rugby league and the English Rugby Football Union which prevented professional players of the 13-man code from playing the amateur 15 a-side game. After this, Birkby spearheaded the effort to overturn the law in the House of Commons.

Technology career
Birkby has held director-level positions for various scientific societies and organizations, including being a founder member of the Institute of Nanotechnology, Chairman of Medilink Northwest, Director of the Australian Nano Business Forum, and Vice-Chair of the Institute of Materials Strategy Commission.

Dynamic Ceramic 
Having worked up through the ranks, Birkby led Dynamic Ceramic through to a management buyout in January 1993 and subsequently executed a trade sale to Bomanton International (Nottingham, UK) in November 1997. Birkby then served as a main board member of Bomanton International. Birkby's notable achievements at Dynamic Ceramic involved being the Regional Award Innovation Award winner in 1995, business of the year (1998) and the UK Government Department of Trade and Industry SMART Award in 1999.

AZoNetwork 
After the sale of his first company, Birkby has worked on AZoNetwork, a Maas Platform (Marketing as a Service). The content marketing platform uses proprietary technology to create, distribute and analyze content performance for companies looking to reach scientists, engineers, and other technical professionals. In 2016, AZoNetwork was listed by BRW as one of the 100 fastest growing companies in Australia. The company announced in October 2019 that it would be enlisting in a reverse IPO on the ASX in Q1 of 2020.

References

External links
(archived by web.archive.org) Statistics at orl-heritagetrust.org.uk
Do I not like that… / Hypocrisy has to end: David Hinchliffe MP explains why he has introduced a Bill to stop rugby union discriminating against the league code
Profile at azonetwork.com

1961 births
Living people
Castleford Tigers players
Doncaster R.L.F.C. players
English rugby league players
Oldham R.L.F.C. players
Rugby league five-eighths
Rugby league players from Pontefract
York Wasps players